The Nanshi River (DT: Lamsiw kev) is a river in Taiwan. The river is governed by Water Management Office of Taipei City Government overseen by the Water Resources Agency.

Geography
The river flows through Wulai District and Xindian District of New Taipei City and Yilan County for 45 km. It is one of the tributaries of Xindian River. At Guishan, Xindian, it combines with Beishi River to form Xindian River. Forward, its down reach has many scenic spots. There are many public hot springs along the river banks.

See also
 List of rivers in Taiwan
 Beishi River

References

Rivers of Taiwan
Landforms of Yilan County, Taiwan
Landforms of New Taipei